A Bachelor of Science (BS, BSc, SB, or ScB; from the Latin ) is a bachelor's degree awarded for programs that generally last three to five years.

The first university to admit a student to the degree of Bachelor of Science was the University of London in 1860. In the United States, the Lawrence Scientific School first conferred the degree in 1851, followed by the University of Michigan in 1855. Nathaniel Southgate Shaler, who was Harvard's Dean of Sciences, wrote in a private letter that "the degree of Bachelor of Science came to be introduced into our system through the influence of Louis Agassiz, who had much to do in shaping the plans of this School."

Whether Bachelor of Science or Bachelor of Arts degrees are awarded in particular subjects varies between universities. For example, an economics student may graduate as a Bachelor of Arts in one university but as a Bachelor of Science in another, and occasionally, both options are offered. Some universities follow the Oxford and Cambridge tradition that even graduates in mathematics and the sciences become Bachelors of Arts, while other institutions offer only the Bachelor of Science degree, even in non-science fields.

At universities that offer both Bachelor of Arts and Bachelor of Science degrees in the same discipline, the Bachelor of Science degree is usually more focused on that particular discipline and is targeted toward students intending to pursue graduate school or a profession in that discipline.

International differences

Georgetown University's School of Foreign Service awards Bachelor of Science degrees in foreign service to all of its undergraduates, although many students major in humanities-oriented fields such as international history or culture and politics. The London School of Economics offers BSc degrees in practically all subject areas, even those normally associated with the arts, while the Oxbridge universities almost exclusively award the BA as a first degree. In both instances, there are historical and traditional reasons. Northwestern University's School of Communication grants BSc degrees in all of its programs of study, including theater, dance, and radio/television/film. University of California, Berkeley grants a BS degree in environmental economics and policy at the College of Natural Resources (CNR), a BS degree in business administration at Haas School of Business, and a BA degree in environmental economics and policy at the College of Letters and Science (L&S). Cornell University offers a BS degree in computer science from its College of Engineering and a BA degree in computer science from its College of Arts and Sciences.

Argentina 
In Argentina most university degrees are given as a license in a discipline. They are specific to a field and awarded to students upon completion of a course of study which lasts at least four and usually five years. 
In most cases, at the end of a course and as a mandatory condition for its completion (and ultimately, to obtain a degree), students are compelled to produce an original research project related to their field. This project is usually referred to as a thesis (although the term actually corresponds to post graduate studies) and, unlike a thesis, it not mandatory to have it presented in front of an assessment board.

Australia, New Zealand and South Africa

In Australia, the BSc is generally a three to four-year degree. An honours year or a master's by research degree is required to progress on to the stage of Doctor of Philosophy (PhD).

In New Zealand, in some cases, the honours degree comprises an additional postgraduate qualification. In other cases, students with strong performance in their second or third year, are invited to extend their degree to an additional year, with a focus on research, granting access to doctoral programs.

In South Africa, the BSc is taken over three years, while the postgraduate BSc (Hons) entails an additional year of study. Admission to the honours degree is on the basis of a sufficiently high average in the BSc major; an honours degree is required for MSc level study, and admission to a doctorate is via the MSc.

Brazil
In Brazil, a Bachelor of Science degree is an undergraduate academic degree and is equivalent to a BSc (Hons). It could take from 4 to 6 years (8 to 12 periods) to complete, is also more specific and could be applied for Scientific Arts courses (like Engineering, Maths, Physics, etc.), somewhat is called Human Art courses in Brazil (like History, Portuguese and Literature and Lawyer studies for example) as well as for Health Arts (like Medicine, Nursery, Zootechnique, Veterinary and Biology for example). To be able to start the bachelor's degree in Brazil the candidate must prove to be proficient in different disciplines and have at least the accumulated Preliminary, Medium and High School degrees accomplished with the minimum merit of 60% to 70% of the degrees and a correspondent study period that can vary from 10 to 12 years minimum. The Bachelor of Science courses in Brazilian Universities normally have the first 1 to 2 years (first 2 to 4 periods) of basic fundamental disciplines (like for example Calculus I, II, III and IV for some engineering courses, Geometry basics and advanced, Analytical Laboratories experiments in Mechanics, Optics, Magnetism, etc.) and the last 2 to 3 years disciplines more related to the professional fields of that Bachelor of Science (for example Units Operations, Thermodynamics, Chemical Reactors, Industrial Processes, Kinetics for Chemical Engineering for example). Some disciplines are prerequisite to others and in some universities, the student is not allowed to course any discipline for the entire next period if he was unsuccessful in just one prerequisite discipline of the present period. Usually, the Bachelor of Science courses demand a one-year mandatory probation period by the end of the course (internship in the specific professional area, like a training period), followed by relatively elaborate written and oral evaluations. To get the certification as BSc, most universities require that the students achieve the accomplishment of 60% to 70% in all the "obligatory disciplines", plus the supervisioned and approved training period (like a supervisioned internship period), the final thesis of the course, and in some BSc programs, the final exam test. The final exam also is required so far. To be a professor, a Bachelor of Sciences is required to get a Licenciature degree, which lasts on top of the periods already studied until getting the BSc (Hons), plus 2 to 3 periods (1 to 1.5 years). With a master's degree (MSc) is also possible, which takes 3 to 5 periods more (1.5 to 2.5 years more).

Britain and Ireland
Commonly in British Commonwealth countries and Ireland graduands are admitted to the degree of Bachelor of Science after having completed a programme in one or more of the sciences. These programmes may take different lengths of time to complete.

A Bachelor of Science receives the designation BSc for an ordinary degree and BSc (Hons) for an honours degree. In England, Wales and Northern Ireland an honours degree is typically completed over a three-year period, though there are a few intensified two-year courses (with less vacation time). Bachelor's degrees (without honours) were typically completed in two years for most of the twentieth century. In Scotland, where access to university is possible after one less year of secondary education, degree courses have a foundation year making the total course length four years.

In Ireland, the former BS was changed to BSc (Hons), which is awarded after four years. The BSc (Ord) is awarded after three years. Formerly at the University of Oxford, the degree of BSc was a postgraduate degree; this former degree, still actively granted, has since been renamed MSc.

Chile
In Chile, the completion of a university program leads to an academic degree as well as a professional title. The academic degree equivalent to Bachelor of Science is "Licenciado en Ciencias", which can be obtained as a result of completing a 4–6 year program. However, in most cases, 4-year programs will grant a Bachelor of Applied Science (Spanish: "Licenciatura en Ciencias Aplicadas") degree, while other 4-year programs will not grant to an academic degree.

Continental Europe
Many universities in Europe are changing their systems into the BA/MA system and in doing so also offering the full equivalent of a BSc or MSc (see Bologna Process).

Czech Republic
Universities in the Czech Republic are changing their systems into the Bachelor of Science/Master of Science system and in doing so also offering the full equivalent of a BSc (Bc.) or MSc (Mgr./Ing.).

Germany
In Germany, there are two kinds of universities: Universitäten and Fachhochschulen (which are also called University of Applied Sciences). Universitäten and Fachhochschulen – both also called Hochschulen - are legally equal, but Fachhochschulen have the reputation of being more related to practice and have no legal right to offer PhD programmes.

The BSc in Germany is equivalent to the BSc(Hons) in the United Kingdom. Many universities in German-speaking countries are changing their systems to the BA/MA system and in doing so also offering the full equivalent of a BSc.

In Germany the BA normally lasts between three and four years (six to eight semesters) and between 180 and 240 ECTS must be earned.

India
Bachelor of Science(B.Sc) is usually a three year graduate program in India offered by state and central universities. Some independent private colleges can also offer BS degrees albeit minimum changes in curriculum. B.Sc is different from Bachelor of Engineering(B.E) or Bachelor of Technology(B.Tech). Two exceptions are the B.Sc (Research) course offered by the Indian Institute of Science which lasts four years and the BS-MS course offered by the IISERs, both of which provide more research and interdisciplinary emphasis.

North America
In Canada, Mexico, and the United States, it is most often a four-year undergraduate degree, typically in engineering, computer science, mathematics, economics, finance, business, or the natural sciences.

There are, however, some colleges and universities, notably in the province of Quebec, that offer three-year degree programs.

Typical completion period

Three years
Australia, Austria, Barbados, Belgium, Belize, Bosnia and Herzegovina (mostly three years, sometimes four), Cameroon, Canada (specifically  Quebec), Cote d'Ivoire, Croatia (mostly three years, sometimes four), Czech Republic (mostly three years, sometimes four), Denmark, England (three or four years with a one-year placement in industry), Estonia, Finland, France, Germany (mostly three years, but can be up to four years), Hungary, Iceland, India (three-year BSc in arts and pure sciences excluding engineering, Agriculture and medicine, four years for engineering program "Bachelor of Engineering" Four year for Agriculture program  "Bachelor of Agriculture"and five years for medicine program "Bachelor of Medicine and Bachelor of Surgery"), Ireland (Ordinary), Israel (for most subjects), Italy, Jamaica (three or four years), Latvia (three or four years), Lebanon (three or four years, five years for Bachelor of Engineering), Malaysia, New Zealand, the Netherlands (three years for research universities, four years for universities of applied sciences), Northern Ireland, Norway, Poland, Portugal, Romania, Scotland (Ordinary), Singapore (honours degree takes 4 years), Slovakia, Slovenia, South Africa (honours degree takes 4 years), Sweden, Switzerland, Trinidad and Tobago, Uganda (mostly three years, sometimes four), United Arab Emirates, Wales, and Zimbabwe.

Four years
Afghanistan, Albania (four or five years), Armenia (four or five years), Australia (honours degree), Azerbaijan (four or five years), Bahrain, Bangladesh (four or five years), Belarus, Belize, Bosnia and Herzegovina, Brazil (four to five years), Brunei (three or four years), Bulgaria, Canada (except Quebec), China, Cyprus, the Dominican Republic, Egypt (four or five years), Ethiopia (engineering, five years), Finland (engineering, practice in industry not included), Georgia, Ghana (three or four years), Greece (four or five years), Guatemala, Haiti (three or four years), Hong Kong (starting from 2012, three years originally), India (four-year BS, Bsc (hons.) Agriculture, Engineering), Indonesia, Iran (four or five years), Iraq, Ireland (Honours Degree), Israel (engineering degree), Japan, Jordan (four to five years), Kazakhstan, Kenya, Kuwait, Libya, Lithuania, North Macedonia (three, four or five years), Malawi (four or five years), Malta, Mexico, Montenegro (three or four years), Myanmar, Nepal (previously three, now four years), the Netherlands (three years for research universities, four years for universities of applied sciences), New Zealand (honours degree), Nigeria, Pakistan (four or five years), the Philippines (four or five years), Romania, Russia, Saudi Arabia, Scotland (Honours Degree), Serbia (three or four years), Spain, South Africa (fourth year is elective — to obtain an Honours degree, which is normally a requirement for selection into a master's degree program), South Korea, Sri Lanka (three, four, or five (specialized) years), Taiwan, Tajikistan (four or five years), Thailand, Romania, Tunisia (only a Bachelor of Science in Business Administration is available, solely awarded by Tunis Business School), Turkey, Ukraine, the United States, Uruguay (four, five, six, or seven years), Yemen, and Zambia (four or five years).

Five years
Cuba (five years), Greece (four or five years), Peru, Argentina, Colombia (starting to change to 4 years), Brazil (five years), Mexico (4.5 years), Chile, Venezuela (five years), Egypt (four or five years), Haiti (four or five years).

Nigeria (four to five years), 6 months dedicated to SIWES (Students Industrial Work Exchange Scheme) but for most sciences and all engineering courses only. A semester for project work/thesis not excluding course work during the bachelor thesis. Excluding 1 year for the compulsory National Youth Service Corps (NYSC), para-military and civil service.

North Macedonia, Sierra Leone (four years dedicated to coursework), Slovenia (four or five years), Sudan (five years for BSc honours degree and four years for BSc ordinary degree), and Syria.

In Algeria, the student presents a thesis in front of a Jury at the end of the fifth year.

Some universities in Canada (such as University of British Columbia and Vancouver Island University) have most of their science and applied science students extend their degree by a year compared to other institutions.

Six years

In Chile, some undergraduate majors such as engineering and geology are designed as 6-year programs. However, in practice it is not uncommon for students to complete such programs over the course of 10 years, while studying full-time without leaves of absence. This is in part due to a strict grading system where the highest grade of a typical class can be as low as 60% (C-) and the high frequency of protests and strikes organized by student federations and teacher unions, such as the 2011–13 Chilean student protests.

There are studies that suggest a direct correlation between reduced social mobility and differences unique to the Chilean higher education system.

See also
 British undergraduate degree classification
 British degree abbreviations
 List of tagged degrees
 Master of Science

Notes

References 

Science